The 2012–13 Hawaii Rainbow Warriors basketball team represented the University of Hawaii at Manoa during the 2012–13 NCAA Division I men's basketball season.

The Rainbow Warriors, led by third year head coach Gib Arnold, played their home games at the Stan Sheriff Center and were first year members of the Big West Conference. They finished the season 17–15, 10–8 in Big West play to finish in fifth place. They lost in the quarterfinals of the Big West tournament to UC Irvine. They were invited to the 2013 CIT where they lost in the first round to Air Force.

The 2012–13 Rainbow Warrior roster was composed of players from eight countries (Angola, Australia, Canada, Croatia, Germany, Latvia, New Zealand, and the United States).

In 2015, Hawaii announced it would vacate wins from this and the 2013–14 season due to the participation of Davis Rozitis and Isaac Fotu, who were ruled ineligible due to improper benefits. The 2016–17 Hawaii media guide indicates that all but the November 12 win over Houston Baptist were vacated. Rozitis did not play in that game.

Roster

Schedule

|-
!colspan=9| Exhibition

|-
!colspan=9| Regular season

|-
!colspan=9| 2013 Big West Conference men's basketball tournament

|-
!colspan=9| 2013 CIT

References

Hawaii
Hawaii Rainbow Warriors basketball seasons
Hawaii
2012 in sports in Hawaii
2013 in sports in Hawaii